Chathura Peiris (born 23 September 1990) is a Sri Lankan first-class cricketer who plays for Ragama Cricket Club.

References

External links
 

1990 births
Living people
Sri Lankan cricketers
Mannar District cricketers
Ragama Cricket Club cricketers
Uthura Rudras cricketers
People from Kalutara
People from Panadura